Dmitriy  Gorbunov (born 16 September 1977 in Novouralsk) is a Russian professional darts player who played in Professional Darts Corporation tournaments.

Darts career

In Russia
In March 2015, Gorbunov got the first experience in his career. He decided to take part in the Novouralsk Darts Cup (local amateur tournament), where four people played, and took third place. At the beginning of 2016, Dmitry won the Ural Darts League, a prestigious local russian tournament.

PDC
He entered the 2020 PDC Q-School, but only won two matches in four events, and got into the last 256. He then entered the Eurotour qualification and reached the semifinals.

Gorbunov qualified for the 2021 PDC World Darts Championship after winning the EuroAsian Darts Corporation Qualifier tournament, defeating Roman Obukhov 3-1 in sets in the final.

In 2021, he won the first two events on the EADC Tour, defeating Evgeniy Izotov in both finals 6–3 and 6–5 respectively.
He won two further events on the EADC Tour,defeating Vitaliy Khohryakov 6-3 and Evgeniy Izotov 6-3.Gorbunov topped the rankings on EADC Tour and will partner Tour Card Holder Boris Koltsov in the 2021 PDC World Cup of Darts to represent Russia.

World Championship Results

PDC
 2021: First round (lost to Jason Lowe 1–3)

References

External links

Living people
1977 births
Russian darts players
Professional Darts Corporation associate players
People from Novouralsk
Sportspeople from Sverdlovsk Oblast